Liebscher is a surname. Notable people with the surname include:

Adolf Liebscher (1857–1919), Czech history painter
Karel Liebscher (1851–1906), Czech landscape painter and illustrator
Richard Liebscher (1910–date of death unknown), German fencer
Tom Liebscher (born 1993), German Olympic canoeist

Surnames from given names